Galbula is the type and largest genus of the jacamar family (Galbulidae) of piciform birds, and its suborder Galbulae. Sometimes, the Piciformes are split in two, with the Galbulae upranked to full order Galbuliformes.

The genus was introduced by the French zoologist Mathurin Jacques Brisson in 1760 with the green-tailed jacamar (Galbula galbula) as the type species. The name galbula is the Latin word for a small yellow bird.

They are smallish to mid-sized forest birds of the Neotropics, with long pointed bills, elongated tails, and small feet. Colored in metallic iridescent hues – typically greenish – at least on the upperside, some have a red or brownish belly. Males and females are generally similar in appearance, but in most species differ in minor plumage details. As usual for Piciformes, they nest in burrows they dig out themselves. In the case of this genus, nests are dug in earthen banks along rivers or roads, or in termitaria. As with other jacamars but otherwise unknown among Piciformes, their chicks do not hatch naked. They have a piping song and  feed in typical jacamar fashion, by catching flying arthropods, typically larger insects such has butterflies.

Most Galbula species are fairly common in their natural range, which despite rampant deforestation is still extensive. Only the coppery-chested jacamar (G. pastazae) occurs in a more restricted region in the Andes foothills, and is considered a threatened species.

Species
Ten living species are presently recognized in this genus:

A fossil species, Galbula hylochoreutes, has been described from the mid-Miocene of Colombia. It was apparently more specialized for aerial feeding than the living species.

References

 
Bird genera
Taxonomy articles created by Polbot